The US National Railroad Hall of Fame was established in 2003 and recognized by Congressional resolutions in 2003 and 2004. The main offices of the hall of fame are in Galesburg, Illinois.

The National Railroad Hall of Fame has three categories for inductees: 
1) 1800-1865: Birth and Development
2) 1866-1945: Golden Era
3) 1946-Present: Modern Era

1800-1865: Birth and Development

1866-1945: Golden Era

1946-Present: Modern Era

References

External links
 Official website
 List of inductees

Galesburg, Illinois
Railway halls of fame
Railroad
History of rail transportation in the United States
Awards established in 2003